Urat (Wasep, Wusyep) is a Torricelli language spoken by a decreasing number of people in Papua New Guinea.

It is spoken by 2,480 people in Wasep Ngau (North Urat dialect), 2,060 in Wusyep Yihre (Central Urat dialect), 1,210 in Wasep Yam (South Urat dialect), and 550 in Wusyep Tep (East Urat dialect).

Phonology
Unusually for a Papuan language, Urat has four voiceless liquids and semivowels, which are ɬ, r̥, w̥, and j̥. Urat consonants are:

{| 
| p || t || ʧ || k || ʔ
|-
| ᵐb || ⁿd || ᶮʤ || ᵑg || 
|-
|  || s || ʃ ||  || h
|-
| m || n || ɲ || ŋ || 
|-
|  || l ||  ||  || 
|-
|  || ɬ ||  ||  || 
|-
|  || r ||  ||  || 
|-
|  || r̥ ||  ||  || 
|-
| ̥w ||  || j ||  || 
|-
| w̥ ||  || j̥ ||  || 
|}

Urat vowels are:

{| 
| i || u
|-
| e || o
|-
| a || 
|}

Pronouns
Pronouns are:

{| 
!  !! sg !! pl
|-
! 1
| ŋam || poi
|-
! 2
| nin || yip
|-
! 3m
| kin
| rowspan="2" | tiŋe
|-
! 3f
| ti
|}

Further reading
Barnes, Barney. 1989. Urat Grammar Essentials. Unpublished manuscript. Ukarumpa, PNG: Summer Institute of Linguistics.

References

Urim languages
Languages of East Sepik Province